The 2018 Japan–South Korea radar lock-on dispute is about an incident between a Japanese aircraft and a South Korean vessel. The aircraft was part of the Japan Maritime Self-Defense Force (JMSDF), while the vessel was part of the Republic of Korea Navy (ROKN). The event occurred on 20 December 2018, without the firing of any weapon, and was followed by a large diplomatic dispute between Japan and South Korea.

Incident
According to the government of Japan, a South Korean naval destroyer, ROKS Gwanggaeto the Great, directed its STIR-180 fire-control radar at a maritime patrol aircraft, Kawasaki P-1 belonging to the Fleet Air Wing 4 of JMSDF, which was conducting surveillance off the Noto Peninsula in the Sea of Japan on Thursday 20 December 2018 at around 3:00 p.m. (JST). According to Japan  Ministry of Defense (MOD), aiming the fire-control (FC) radar at a plane is violation of the Code for Unplanned Encounters at Sea (CUES), as a lock with the FC radar is generally considered as a hostile act one step before actual firing. The MOD further said the irradiation of the P-1 plane by the radar hit multiple times continuously over a certain period.

In contrast, the government of South Korea denied Japan's claims, stating that it did not operate STIR-180 radar (FC radar) but MW08 radar for the rescue when the Japanese plane arrived at the site. The MW08 radar is a 3D radar for medium-range air and surface surveillance, target acquisition and tracking, capable of gun control against surface targets. MW08 can be used as an FC radar, but it is not connected with the fire-control system in the destroyer.

Timeline

2018
 On 20 December, a fishing vessel sent out a distress signal. The South Korean coast guard and South Korean navy deployed rescue ships. The North Korean fishing boat was a small wooden boat that weighed less than 1 ton with four or five North Koreans at the time of the rescue. It was reported that one or two of the North Koreans had already died at the time of the rescue. Korea Coast Guard and Korean Navy operated a radar to assist in the rescue. The Japanese Ministry of Defense (MoD) claimed a Kawasaki P-1 maritime patrol aircraft from Fleet Air Wing 4 of the JMSDF was irradiated several times for a few minutes by a destroyer of the Republic of Korea Navy with a FCR. The incident occurred off the Noto Peninsula within a joint fishing zone of the two countries, surrounded by Japan's exclusive economic zone, away from the disputed Liancourt Rocks. After receiving the radiation, the P-1 patrol aircraft tried repeatedly to contact the other party by radio to ascertain their intentions, but got no response from the South Korean naval ship. According to South Korea, the audio communication the Japanese P-1 patrol aircraft attempted to transmit contained severe static and thus the South Korean warship could not discern the message.
 On 21 December, the Japanese Minister of Defense, Takeshi Iwaya, held a press conference to clarify the facts of the incident. While he told the reporters that the intention of the South Korean side was not clearly understood, he criticized the incident as an extremely dangerous action.
 On 22 December, the Japanese MoD conducted a careful and detailed analysis of the incident, and concluded that the irradiation was from STIR-180, which is unsuitable for broad searches. Accordingly, the MoD stated that irradiation with a FCR was a very dangerous action that could lead to unexpected contingencies. Even though it had been searching for a ship in distress, it greatly endangered other ships and aircraft in the vicinity. The Code for Unplanned Encounters at Sea (CUES), which both Japan and South Korea have adopted, suggests avoiding any radar irradiation from a FCR to aim at ships and aircraft. For these reasons, Japan strongly requested South Korea prevent any recurrence of the incident.
 On 22 December, South Korean Ministry of National Defense (MND) announced that they did not use the FCR (STIR-180) but it was operating an MW08 radar with the surveillance and tracking functions. The South Korean MND also claimed that there was no intent to aim it at the Japanese aircraft.
 On 23 December, the South Korean MND argued that it had already explained its position to Japan and would strive harder to ensure that there would not be any "misunderstanding".
 On 23 December, the Japanese Minister of Foreign Affairs, Tarō Kōno, withheld any direct criticism, and announced that he would like to ask the Government of South Korea to respond to the incident in order to prevent relations between Japan and South Korea deteriorating.
 On 24 December, the Director-General of the Asian and Oceanian Affairs Bureau of the Japanese Ministry of Foreign Affairs, Kenji Kanasugi, visited the South Korean Ministry of Foreign Affairs to express Japan's strong regret and make a request for the prevention of the recurrence of this kind of incident. The Government of South Korea continuously denied the usage of STIR-180 while admitting the usage of MW08 for the rescue. After the statement of the Government of South Korea, Takeshi Iwaya pointed out at a press conference that the Government of South Korea had some misunderstanding about the incident, and published a statement by the Japanese MoD that the maritime patrol aircraft had been repeatedly irradiated with electromagnetic waves characteristic of a FCR continuously for certain periods.
 On 26 December, a member of the South Korean minor progressive Justice Party accused the Japanese Government, particularly the ruling Liberal Democratic Party, of "trying to antagonize South Korea by making up the allegation that the radar was pointed at the patrol plane."
 On 27 December, Japan and South Korea held working-level teleconference over this issue between Mr. Hidehiro Ikematsu (Joint Staff Principal Councilor of the Japanese MoD) and Major General Kim Jeong-yoo (Operations Director of the South Korean JCS), etc. According to the informed sources of the Korean military, Both JMSDF and ROKN proposed to bring data received by Japanese aircraft and information on radar equipped by Korean destroyers, but they failed to meet an agreement due to security problem. According to the release of the Korean MND, the defense authorities of the two nations "exchanged opinions regarding the truth and technical analysis to remove misunderstandings.", and agreed "to continue consultations on the matter. In case the two sides fail to settle the conflict through working-level talks, higher-level meetings could be held later"
 On 28 December, the Japanese MoD released a video taken by the maritime patrol aircraft during the incident. The video shows that a crewmember asked the destroyer in English several times via three frequencies(international VHF (156.8 MHz) and emergency frequencies 121.5 MHz and 243 MHz) about the FC antenna directed at the P-1, but the destroyer stayed silent. The video also shows the gray destroyer sailing near a pair of rubber boats and a North Korean vessel. Sankei Shimbun reported that Japanese Prime Minister Abe had directed Japanese Defense Minister Takeshi Iwaya to release the video publicly, though the Defense Minister was reluctant to release the video, worrying about a possible backlash from South Korea. Korean MND expressed deep concerns and regrets over Japan's release of video footage related to an ongoing military radar spat just one day after two governments started a "working level conference" on 27 December, and accused Tokyo of releasing "inaccurate" facts. Korean MND argued that "The video material released by Japan contains only footage of the Japanese patrol plane circling above the surface of the sea and the (audio) conversation between the pilots and it cannot by common sense be regarded as objective evidence supporting the Japanese claims. There's no change to the fact that our military did not operate tracking radar on a Japanese patrol plane."

2019
 On 2 January, Korean MND released a statement demanding an apology from Japan that the P-1 patrol aircraft was flying dangerously low over their naval destroyer.
 On 4 January, Japanese Foreign Minister Taro Kono and Korean Foreign Minister Kang Kyung-wha agreed over a phone conference to resolve the issue through "consultations between their military authorities". Korean MND released a video criticizing Japan for the low flying altitude of the maritime patrol aircraft. The video also claimed that the Korean destroyer did not illuminate any tracking radar. The video mainly consists of the materials released by the Japanese MoD a week before.
 On 8 January, Japanese Defense Minister Takeshi Iwaya repeatedly commented that Japan would be able to exchange radar wave records with the South Korean military to deepen discussion with South Korea.
 On 14 January, Japan and South Korea held conference at Singapore. At this conference, some of misunderstandings were explained like the communication, later found that the communication personnel in the destroyer had misheard the radio communication. Both countries suggested to analyze recorded data together, but they did not reach an agreement on major issues: about the usage of the radar and the threatening flight. The radar problem couldn't be resolved; the dissatisfaction of Japanese side about the radar was that Japan was asked to present the record of the RWR record first, not exchanging the records of both countries at the same time to avoid forgery, and the discontent of Korean side was that the Japan will show only a part of the P-1's record, excluding received frequencies, while Korean side was asked to disclose entire radars' specification and frequencies of the destroyer. About the matter of the threatening flight, Japan claimed "the MSDF P-1 maintained (even at its closet flight) a sufficiently safe altitude (approx.150m) and distance (approx. 500m) from the ROK destroyer" and requested ROK for the objective evidence to support their claim, but ROK had failed to provide such evidence and had repeatedly responded “if the subject of the threat feels threatened, it is then a threat,"  while Korean MND claimed that "safe altitude (approx.150m) and distance (approx. 500m)" is based on ICAO applying to civil flight, not a flight made by a government. They also claimed that when flights with altitude and distance admitted by Japanese were made to Japanese ship, JMSDF would also protest. Although Japanese MoD replied that they would not protest against it, Japan didn't acknowledge it as an official statement when Korean representatives asked whether they can declare it internationally. Both Japan and South Korea promised to hold further negotiations.
 On 21 January, Japanese MoD released the final statement regarding this incident including the location-relationship-diagram and the sound file of the radar reception(also known as RWR records). Japanese MoD also pointed out that this sound file evidence(RWR records) was rejected to be examined by Korean MND at the time of working-level consultations held on 14 January. After Japan's final statement, Choi hyon-su, official spokesperson of Korean MND, on the official regular briefing, stated "(from the sound records released on January.21) We couldn't interpret the sound records since we were not passed conversion logs for the records from Japan, and RWR reception record cannot exactly prove the usage of STIR-180 since various radars were used at the time, like Kelvin radar making similar frequencies, using I-band, in Sambongho, Korea Coast Guard's vessel, and MW08 that can be identified as FC radar, that could have confused P-1's ESM recorder." Japan declared there would be no more working-level consultations while Korean MND suggesting further joint investigations comparing each countries' data.

 On 22 January, Korean MND released the formal statement summarizing their previous arguments explaining issues about the radar and the flight. Korean MND stated "The fundamental nature of this issue is the JMSDF patrol aircraft's threatening low-altitude flight towards the ROK Navy vessel that had been conducting a humanitarian rescue operation. ...  We express our deepest regrets to Japan for discontinuing the working-level meetings without providing any decisive evidence. Along with the solid ROK-US Combined Defense Posture, our government will continue its efforts to strengthen security cooperation between the ROK and Japan despite the current incident."
The South Korean military called this action a "clear provocation" that "if such activity repeats again, our military will respond strongly based on our response rules." The Japanese Defense Minister denied the allegation, saying "the altitude of the Japanese aircraft claimed by Korea, is not accurate, we are properly recording our flight. The Japanese aircraft was flying higher than altitude of 150 meters, following the international and domestic law. Japan Chief Cabinet Secretary Yoshihide Suga encouraged better communication between the military forces of the two countries.
 On 24 January, Korean MND released 5 pictures taken by a camcorder and a thermal camera connected with a radar in the destroyer with recorded height and distance of the patrol plane.Korean MND explained that it detected the exact altitude and distance using a maritime surveillance radar. Japan stated that (regarding the photo with Japanese patrol aircraft P3C) it does not prove the altitude of the aircraft since the surface of the sea is not included in the picture.
 On 25 January, the spokesperson of Korean MND, Choi hyon-su stated, "If Japan cannot trust our radar data that we revealed in yesterday, Japan should suggest more reliable evidence." Japan stated "We have no reason or intention to threaten Korea's destroyer. If the two approaches, our patrol aircraft is not armed and the other is the destroyer, the unarmed will feel more threatened"
 On 27 January, Korean Minister of National Defense Jeong Kyeong-doo declared, "If we judge that Japan performed a provocative act again, we will respond strongly based on our domestic law," suggesting the use of weapons.
On 1 June, Japanese Defense Minister Takeshi Iwaya expressed his decision to end talks about the dispute to Korean Minister of National Defense Jeong Kyeong-doo. While both defense ministers could not reach a conclusion together, both have pledged to make to efforts to improve relations between the two countries.

Views and opinions
Toshio Tamogami, a retired general and ex-Chief of Staff of the JASDF, has given his views on his Twitter denying the offensiveness of aiming FC radar. However, Toshiyuki Ito, a retired JMSDF admiral and ex-commandant of the Joint Staff College, rebutted Tamogami's view since the former had been retired for ten years and has no experience as a pilot.

The Government of South Korea claimed this flight of P-1 was menacing and unfriendly to the warship of a neighbour country which was operating a rescue mission in the high seas. According to the Government of Korea, it is Japan, not Korea, if any, that acted ungentlemanly and menacingly to the neighbour country at the site and should apologize to the other.  However, Paul Giarra, a retired U.S. naval aviator and ex-senior Country Director for Japan in the Office of the ASD (ISA), pointed it out that there was absolutely no danger in the actions of the Japanese aircraft.

Some Korean conservative media were concerned about the friction between Seoul and Tokyo. On 7 January 2019, JoongAng Daily editorial argued that the two governments "should join forces to address the nuclear threats from North Korea and other urgent issues" and that "This emotional fighting does not help. Though what really happened at the moment has not yet been found, either side did not suffer substantial damage. Therefore, if Korean destroyer really aimed its FCR at the approaching airplane, our military authorities should apologize to Japan and wrap up the case. If the Japanese aircraft was really confused about the radar signal, it should apologize", and that "[i]t is time to take a deep breath and find a reasonable solution".

South Korean government stipulated that the Japanese Self-Defense Forces' aircraft  deliberately threatened the South Korean Navy with low-flying flights on a total of four occasions from Dec. 20, 2018 to Jan. 23, 2019. While there is no international law regulating the altitude of military flights, Japan, the US Army, and NATO assert they follow the custom of the International Civil Aviation Organization (ICAO) to keep a distance of 150 meters from vessels under normal operations.

External links 

 Regarding the incident of an ROK naval vessel directing its fire-control radar at an MSDF patrol aircraft（Japan Ministry of Defense）

References

2018 in Japan
2018 in South Korea
Non-combat naval accidents
Accidents and incidents involving military aircraft
Japan–South Korea military relations
Maritime incidents in 2018
International maritime incidents
Maritime incidents in Japan
Maritime incidents in South Korea
Japan Maritime Self-Defense Force
Naval history of South Korea
Naval history of Japan